Bryner may refer to:

Surname
Alex Bryner, (born 1943) American jurist
Lilian Bryner, Swiss female racing driver
Hans Bryner, Swiss former Olympic sailor

Given name
Cadwaladr Bryner Jones, leading figure in Welsh agricultural education

See also
Yul Brynner